The Communauté d'agglomération Grand Paris Sud Seine-Essonne-Sénart is the communauté d'agglomération, an intercommunal structure, in the southern suburbs of Paris. It is located in the Essonne and Seine-et-Marne departments, in the Île-de-France region, northern France. It was created in January 2016. Its seat is in Courcouronnes. Its area is 221.2 km2. Its population was 352,123 in 2018.

Composition
The communauté d'agglomération consists of the following 23 communes, of which 8 (Cesson, Combs-la-Ville, Lieusaint, Moissy-Cramayel, Nandy, Réau, Savigny-le-Temple and Vert-Saint-Denis) are in the Seine-et-Marne department:

Bondoufle
Cesson
Combs-la-Ville
Corbeil-Essonnes
Le Coudray-Montceaux
Étiolles
Évry-Courcouronnes
Grigny
Lieusaint
Lisses
Moissy-Cramayel
Morsang-sur-Seine
Nandy
Réau
Ris-Orangis
Saint-Germain-lès-Corbeil
Saint-Pierre-du-Perray
Saintry-sur-Seine
Savigny-le-Temple
Soisy-sur-Seine
Tigery
Vert-Saint-Denis
Villabé

References

Paris Sud Seine-Essonne-Senart
Grand Paris Sud Seine-Essonne-Senart
Grand Paris Sud Seine-Essonne-Senart